R. Balakrishnan is a bureaucrat, author, researcher, poet and has written several books in Tamil. He is a former Indian Administrative Service officer. Currently he serves as the chief advisor (special initiative) to the Chief Minister of Odisha state government.

Early life
R. Balakrishnan was born in Natham (Dindigul district). He studied BA and MA in Tamil Literature in Madurai. After that worked as Sub-Editor in Madurai Dinamani Daily Newspaper From 1980  to  1984 July  .  He was the first candidate to take the civil service in Tamil and was selected in the Indian Administrative Services in the first attempt. He belongs to the 1984 batch.

Career

In his thirty-four years of civil service with the Government of Odisha and the Government of India, Balakrishnan hold several notable positions.  He retired as the additional chief secretary and development commissioner in 2018. Earlier, he held the assignment of Deputy Election Commissioner, Election Commission of India twice. He also served as the Chief Vigilance Officer, Chennai Petroleum Corporation Limited, Chennai. Currently, he is the Chief Advisor to the Chief Minister's Office and Chief Advisor (Special Initiatives)  Government of Odisha.

Research

R. Balakrishnan is a researcher in the field of Onomastics, Indology, and Tamil Studies. He has been consistently working for the last 30 years on the issues connected to the Dravidian origin, the prehistory of Tamils and Indus Valley Civilization. He follows a multi-disciplinary approach in the reconstruction of the past with a specific focus on place name clusters. Using comparative place name clusters as markers for past migrations he has published many research papers in internationally and nationally acclaimed research journals. He has done extensive research about various aspects of Konark Sun temple and the tribal origins of Sun worship.

In 1997, he brought out the evidence for the existence of a cluster of place names in tribal areas of Madhya Pradesh that are exact counterparts of place names used in Madurai-Idukki region of southern India. He called this ‘Chhindwara Syndrome’ and further investigations drew him to Indus Valley Civilization.

In 2010, World Classical Tamil Conference at Coimbatore, he announced evidence for  ‘Korkai-Vanji-Tondi Complex’ (KVT Complex) that has survived in the place name corpora of northwestern parts of the Indian subcontinent. He cited this as evidence for the probable Dravidian presence in the Indus Valley region in the past.

His publication ‘The ‘High-West: Low-East’ Dichotomy of Indus Cities: A Dravidian Paradigm’ (Indus Research Centre, Roja Muthiah Research Library, 2012) put forth multi-disciplinary evidence in favour of Dravidian Hypothesis. His Tamil publication ‘Cintuveḷip paṇpāṭṭiṉ tirāviṭa aṭittaḷam’ (சிந்துவெளிப் பண்பாட்டின் திராவிட அடித்தளம்) in 2016 has created wide awareness of the Dravidian Hypothesis of Indus civilization among the modern Tamils. The renowned Indus scholar Iravatham Mahadevan hails this book as the “most remarkable among the Tamil works published so far on this subject”. This book was one of the top sellers in Chennai book fair 2017 and has acquired greater significance as the announcement regarding Keezhadi excavation and its probable similarities with Harappan artefacts were made within a few months of the publication of this book.

He was awarded Doctor of Letters (Honoris Causa) by Periyar Maniammai University for his contribution in the field of Indology and in the specific context of his book ‘Cintuveḷip paṇpāṭṭiṉ tirāviṭa aṭittaḷam’.

He is currently the Honorary Consultant of the Indus Research Centre of the Roja Muthiah Research Library, Chennai. His latest book on the Indus Valley Civilization, “Journey of a Civilization: Indus to Vaigai” was published by the Roja Muthiah Research Library in December 2019.

He has done extensive research on the multi-layered prehistory and cultural heritage of Odisha. His recent book Abadha Padachinha is the Odia translation of his research articles on Odisha its history, culture and heritage.

Works
Balakrishnan is also a poet and lyricist. He has written books in Tamil and English.

His publications are Anbulla Amma (1991), Siragukkul Vaanam (2012), Sinduveli Panpattin Travida Adithalam (2016), Nattukkural (2016), Panmaayak Kalvan (2018), Irandam Sutru (2018), Abadha Padachinha (articles about Odisha)(translation in Odiya)  (2019) and Journey of a Civilization: Indus to Vaigai (2019, Kadavul Aayinum Aaga(2021), Ani Nadai Yerumai(2022), Oer Yer Uzhavan(2022).

References 

Living people
Indian Tamil people
Indian male writers
Year of birth missing (living people)
People from Dindigul district